The Town of Cape Broyle (population: 499) is an incorporated community located on the Avalon Peninsula in Newfoundland and Labrador, Canada. During King William's War, the village was destroyed in the Avalon Peninsula Campaign.

Demographics 

References

External links

Towns in Newfoundland and Labrador